Citizen USA: A 50 State Road Trip is an HBO documentary film directed by Alexandra Pelosi.

Overview
A documentary about new American immigrants that spans all fifty states.

References

External links

HBO official site

HBO documentary films
Documentary films about immigration to the United States
Films directed by Alexandra Pelosi